Henryk Bałuszyński (15 July 1972 – 1 March 2012) was a Polish international football striker.

Career
Bałuszyński was born in Knurów. He scored four goals for the Polish national team in fifteen appearances. On 1 March 2012, he died of a heart attack.

Statistics

References

External links
 
 

1972 births
2012 deaths
Deaths from cardiovascular disease
People from Knurów
Polish footballers
Poland international footballers
Association football forwards
Górnik Zabrze players
VfL Bochum players
Arminia Bielefeld players
SV Babelsberg 03 players
Rot Weiss Ahlen players
Enosis Neon Paralimni FC players
Bundesliga players
2. Bundesliga players
Cypriot First Division players
Sportspeople from Silesian Voivodeship
Polish expatriate footballers
Expatriate footballers in Germany
Polish expatriate sportspeople in Germany
Expatriate footballers in Cyprus
Polish expatriate sportspeople in Cyprus